Ngoako Ramatlhodi (born 21 August 1955), a senior member of the African National Congress, was South Africa's Minister of Public Service and Administration from 2015 to March 2017. In the first Zuma administration he had been an MP and a controversial member of the Judicial Service Commission. He resigned as MP in 2017.

Up to 2015 he was Minister of Mineral Resources. Ramatlhodi claimed in 2017 that Eskom chairperson Ben Ngubane and  chief executive Brian Molefe requested that he terminate Glencor's mining licenses in an apparent ruse to facilitate the sale of its Optimum coal mine to the Gupta family. He was assigned to his subsequent ministerial post after he supposedly did not comply.

He was axed in the cabinet reshuffle of March 2017, allegedly without being given reasons. His position was taken by a known Zuma ally, the then Free State economic development MEC Mosebenzi Zwane. In the same reshuffle, finance minister Pravin Gordhan and his deputy, Mcebisi Jonas, were also replaced.

References

African National Congress politicians
1955 births
Living people
Northern Sotho people
Government ministers of South Africa
Members of the Limpopo Provincial Legislature